is a Japanese actress, voice actress and singer. She was born in Yamato, Kanagawa.

She has voiced several characters throughout her career, such as Sailor Galaxia in Sailor Moon: Sailor Stars and Remi in the Nippon Animation World Masterpiece Theater series Remi, Nobody's Girl. She is also part of the judging panel at the Animax Anison Grand Prix, with fellow singers Ichirou Mizuki, and Yumi Matsuzawa. As a voice actress, she is contracted to Aoni Production.

Filmography

Anime
 Akko in Himitsu no Akko-chan (1988)
 Polaris Hilda in Saint Seiya
 Beron, in Kaizoku Sentai Gokaiger the Movie: The Flying Ghost Ship
 Remi, in Remi, Nobody's Girl
 Judy Abbott in My Daddy Long Legs
 Jeanie MacDowell in Jeanie with the Light Brown Hair
 Monica in Porphy no Nagai Tabi
 Sailor Galaxia in Sailor Moon: Sailor Stars
 Narration, Cinderella in Grimm's Fairy Tale Classics
 Tsuntsunodanoteiyugo Tsun & Obotchaman in Dr. Slump Arale-Chan
 Upa in Dragon Ball
 Mitamura Yaeko "Yakko" in Ai Shite Knight
 Miyuki Moriki in Submarine Super 99
 Susumu Hori, Anna Hottenmeyer, and Puchi in the Mr. Driller series
Woodward in Little Witch Academia (TV)

Dubbing
Private School (1984 Fuji TV edition), Christine Ramsey (Phoebe Cates)
West Side Story (1990 TBS edition), Maria (Natalie Wood)

Theme songs

Opening themes
 "Kurenai Sanshiro" Judo Boy (1969) (Her very first anime theme song; performed when she was only 12 years old)
 "Sazae-san" Sazae-san (1969) (Horie's song was used as the opening theme in 1975)
 "Akubi Musume" Hakushon Daimaou (2nd opening) (1969)
 "Mahou no Mako-chan" Mahō no Mako-chan (1970)
 "We Love You, We Love You!!! Witch Teacher" Majo Sensei (1971)
 "Midori no Hidamari" Yamanezumi Rocky Chuck (1973)
 "Kerokko Demetan" Kerokko Demetan (1973; also known as The Brave Frog)
 "Bokura Kyōdai Tentō Mushi" The Song of Tentomushi (1974)
 "Susume! Gorenger" with Isao Sasaki Himitsu Sentai Gorenger (1975–77)
 "Kum Kum's Song" Wanpaku Omukashi Kum Kum (1975)
 "La Seine no Hoshi" La Seine no Hoshi (1975)
 "Sinbad's Adventures" Arabian Nights: Sindbad no Boken (1975)
 "Watashi wa Candy" Candy Candy (1976)
 "Magne Robo Gakeen" with Ichirou Mizuki Magne Robo Gakeen (1976–77)
 "Tatakae! Ninja Captor!" with Ichirou Mizuki Ninja Captor (1976–1977)
 "Voltes V no Uta" Voltes V 1976–77
 "Little Lulu and Her Little Friends" "Little Lulu and Her Little Friends" (1976–1977)
 "Ashita e Attack!" Attack on Tomorrow (1977)
 "Yakukyou no Uta" Song of Baseball Enthusiasts (1977)
 "Majokko Tickle" Majokko Tickle (1978)
 Uchū Majin Daikengo (1978)
 "Hana no Ko Lunlun" Hana no Ko Lunlun (1979)
 "Hello Lalabel" Lalabel (1980)
 "Hello! Sandybell" Hello! Sandybell (1981)
 "Hashire! Jolie" Meiken Jolie (also known as Belle and Sebastian) (1981)
 "Dare ka Watashi wo Matte iru" The Wizard of Oz (1982)
 "Koi wa Totsuzen" Ai shite Knight(1983)
 "Cross Fight!" with Ichirou Mizuki Dangaioh (1987–89)
 "Himitsu no Akko-chan" Himitsu no Akko-chan (1st remake)(1988)
 Dagon in the Lands of Weeds (1988)
 "Yume no Hikouki" Wowser (TV Series) (1988-1989) 
 "Growing Up" My Daddy Long Legs (1990)
 "Taiyō o Oikakete" Jeanie with the Light Brown Hair (1992)
 "Chō Ninja Tai Inazuma!! SPARK" Chō Ninja Tai Inazuma!! SPARK (2007)
 "New Moon ni Koishite" Sailor Moon Crystal (2016)

Ending themes
 "Akubi Musume" Hakushon Daimaou (1969)
 "Ran no Uta" Genshi Shonen Ryu (1971)
 "Kokoro no Uta" Wandering Sun (1971)
 "Makeru na Demetan" Kerokko Demetan (1973)
 "Rocky and Polly" Yamanezumi Rocky Chuck (1973)
 "Hiyoko de Shura" The Song of Tentomushi (1974)
 "Saurus-kun" Wanpaku Omukashi Kum Kum (1975)
 "Watashi wa Simone" La Seine no Hoshi (1975)
 "Sinbad's Song" Arabian Nights: Sindbad no Boken (1975)
 "Ashita ga Suki" Candy Candy (1976)
 "Kawa no Uta" Huckleberry no Bouken (1976)
 Chojin Sentai Baratack (1977)
 "Volleyball ga suki" Attack on Tomorrow (1977)
 "Yuuki no Theme" Song of Baseball Enthusiasts (1977)
 "I'm Lulu!" "Little Lulu and Her Little Friends" (1976–1977)
 "Tickle and Tiko's Cha-Cha-Cha" Majokko Tickle (1978)
 "Aozora-tte Iina" Doraemon (1979–2005) (Ending #7)
 "Mahou Shoujo Lalabel" Mahou Shoujo Lalabelle (1980)
 "Shiroi Suisen" Hello! Sandybell (1981)
 "Futari de Hanbunko" Meiken Jolie (1981)
 "Anata ni Shinjitsuichiro" Dr. Slump (1986)
 "Kokoro no Honesty" Dangaioh (1987–89)
 "DON'T YOU" Himitsu no Akko-chan (1988)
 "Kimi no Kaze" My Daddy Long Legs (1990)
 "Omoide no Kagami" Jeanie with the Light Brown Hair (1992)
 "Egao no Loop" Jewelpet (2009)

Insert songs
 "Daltanius no Uta" (for Daltanius 1979–80)
 "Koi no Hana Uranai" Hana no Ko Lunlun (1979)
 "Lilac no Hanakotoba" Hana no Ko Lunlun (1979)
 "My Beautiful Town" Mahou Shoujo Lalabelle (1980)
 "Ashiato March"
 "Fukafuka Jolie" (with "Tadashi")
 "Jolie no Uta"
 "Rena ga Suki"
 "Shuppatsu no Uta"
 "Ichi Tasu Ichi wa Nani?" The Wizard of Oz (1982)
 "Athena no Komoriuta ~Lullaby~" (for Saint Seiya 1988)
 "Time" with Hironobu Kageyama (for Saint Seiya 1988)
 "Shine On ~Eien no Yume~" (for Saint Seiya 1990)
 "Golden Queen Galaxia" (Character song for Sailor Moon Sailor Stars 1996)
 "Susume! Driller!" (for Mr. Driller G 2001)
 "Suna to Shi no Ballad" (for Desert Punk 2005)

Discography

Original albums 

 EMOTION (1980)
 IMAGE (1981)
 Ready MADONNA (1982)
 Weekend (1983)
 Sunao ni nare Nakute (1983)
 Live in Egg-man (1985)
 IN MY HEART (1986)
 SING IT! (1986)

Best albums 

 TV Shudaika Hit Album Mitsuko Horie to Tomi ni (1971)
 Mitsuko Horie : TV Animation no Sekai (1977)
 Mitsuko Horie : Anime Roman no Sekai (1978)
 Mitsuko Horie Best 24 (1978)
 Mitsuko Horie New Hit Best 16 (1979)
 Micchi no Heya (1980)
 Mitsuko Horie : Anime Best Hit (1981)
 Anime Heroine : Mitsuko Horie Action Anime wo Utau (1982)
 Mitsuko Horie Original Best 12 (1984)
 Debut (1989)
 Mitsuko Horie 20th Anniversary Recital Vol. 1-2 (1989)
 Mitsuko Horie Original Best Album (1993)
 Mitsuko Horie : Best & Best (1995)
 Mitsuko Horie : Heartful Concert (1996)
 Kaiki Kottou Ongaku-bako (1997)
 Mitsuko Horie 30th Anniversary : MICCHI 100% ~Ashita ga Suki~ (1999)
 Kokoro no Uta~Iyashi no Uta goe~ Mitsuko Horie Best (2004)
 Mitsuko Horie 40th Anniversary (2009)
 Best
 Micchi no Hitorigoto Club
 Encore
 Mitsuko Horie Rare Groove Tracks (2014)
 Best of Best : Mitsuko Horie (2015)
 Heisei no Mitsuko Horie (2019)
 Mitsuko Horie 50th Anniversary Best Album : One Girl BEST (2020)

References

External links 
 Official website 
 Official agency profile 
 
 

1957 births
Living people
Voice actresses from Kanagawa Prefecture
Japanese women pop singers
Japanese video game actresses
Japanese voice actresses
Musicians from Kanagawa Prefecture
People from Yamato, Kanagawa
Anime singers
20th-century Japanese actresses
21st-century Japanese actresses
20th-century Japanese women singers
20th-century Japanese singers
21st-century Japanese women singers
21st-century Japanese singers
Aoni Production voice actors